Rabbi Dr Yaacov Kopul Rosen (1913–1962) was an important anglo-Jewish rabbi and educationalist.  In 1946 he testified before the Anglo-American Commission of Inquiry  on Palestine, asking them not to "play politics with the remnants of the Jewish people." A book titled Memories of Kopul Rosen was published in 1970.

Biography
Rabbi Dr Yaacov Kopul Rosen was born on 4 November 1913, in Notting Hill, London. He trained for the rabbinate in the Etz Chaim Yeshiva in London and in the Mir Yeshiva in Lithuania. He was the rabbi of the Higher Crumpsall Synagogue in Manchester from 1938 until 1942. He became the Communal Rabbi of Glasgow in 1942 and in 1944 he was appointed the Principal Rabbi of the Federation of Synagogues in London.

Rosen died of leukemia in March 1962 at the age of 48, leaving behind his wife, Bella, three sons, Jeremy (b . 1942), Michael (1945–2008) and David (b. 1951), and a baby daughter, Angela (Ayelet) (b. 1959). All three sons became rabbis.

A book about his father was published by Jeremy in 2010 (revised 2012).

Carmel College

In 1948 Rosen decided to leave the rabbinate to devote himself to the promotion of Jewish education. He and his wife, Bella, founded Carmel College an independent Jewish boarding school in Oxfordshire, UK. The school, which practiced Orthodox Judaism, was described in a 1973-published book, Carmel College in the Kopel Era: A History of Carmel College, September 1948-March.

YAKAR
In 1979 Rabbi Rosen's second son, Rabbi Dr Michael (Mickey) Rosen, founded the Jewish educational organization, Yakar, in memory of his father.  (YaKaR is both an acronym for Yaacov Kopul Rosen and means in Hebrew precious.) The stated goal of Yakar is to continue Kopul Rosen's ideals "of a Judaism based on knowledge of Torah, learning and vibrant spirituality that would at the same time be universal, non-denominational, tolerant and open to ideas and intellectual curiosity."

Works by Kopul Rosen
 Dear David
 Rabbi Israel Salanter and the Musar movement
 The future of the Federation of Synagogues
 An open letter to a perplexed parent

Personal
His wife's name was Bella. They had three sons, rabbis, and a daughter, who attended Carmel College.

References

External links
 Carmel College
  Seven Years at Carmel College
 Yakar
 Yakar-UK
 Rabbi Jeremy Rosen

1913 births
1962 deaths
British Orthodox rabbis
20th-century British rabbis
Burials at the Jewish cemetery on the Mount of Olives
Mir Yeshiva alumni